O-Acetylbufotenine (5-AcO-DMT, bufotenine acetate) is a tryptamine derivative which produces psychedelic-appropriate responding in animal studies. It is an acylated derivative of bufotenine with higher lipophilicity that allows it to cross the blood–brain barrier; once inside the brain, it is metabolised to bufotenine. It also acts directly as an agonist at 5-HT1A and 5-HT1D receptors.

See also 
 4-AcO-DMT
 5-EtO-DMT
 5-HO-AMT
 5-HO-DiPT

References 

Designer drugs
Psychedelic tryptamines
Serotonin receptor agonists
Tertiary amines
Acetate esters